Pu-239 is a 2006 British drama film written and directed by Hollywood producer Scott Z. Burns in his feature directorial debut, which was based on the book PU-239 and Other Russian Fantasies written by Ken Kalfus. The film was shown twice at the 2006 Toronto International Film Festival under the title The Half Life of Timofey Berezin before being distributed by HBO Films under its original working title. Pu-239 is the chemical symbol for plutonium-239 (239Pu), a radioactive isotope of the chemical element plutonium.

Plot
Timofey Berezin (Paddy Considine) works at a former top-secret, badly run and aged nuclear reprocessing facility plant in Skotoprigonyevsk-16, a former closed city and a naukograd. At the film's outset, he is exposed to radioactive contamination while selflessly trying to prevent a critical malfunction. The facility's managers tell him that his exposure was a survivable 100 rems, while accusing him of sabotage and suspending him without pay. Loyal coworkers, however, help Timofey discover the truth that he was exposed to 1,000 rems of radiation. Suffering from acute radiation poisoning, he has only days to live.

Before Timofey's adoring wife, Marina (Radha Mitchell), is fully aware of his fate, he leaves for Moscow, on a mission to secure a better future for her and their young son. He hooks up with a small-time gangster, Shiv (Oscar Isaac), in hopes of finding a buyer for a selfmade canister of a little over 100 grams of weapons-grade plutonium salt he has stolen. It is 1995, only a few years after the dissolution of the Soviet Union, and they spend their time frequenting the hotels, nightclubs and private palaces of the new Moscow underworld, ricocheting between two rival crime lords (Nikolaj Lie Kaas and Steven Berkoff). However, what Timofey and Shiv never realize is that they are both caught in the same dilemma: trying to find a way free of a certain fate; hoping to do right by their loved ones before it is too late.

Cast 
 Paddy Considine - Timofey
 Oscar Isaac - Shiv
 Radha Mitchell - Marina
 Steven Berkoff - Starkov
 Nikolaj Lie Kaas - Tusk
 Mélanie Thierry - Oxsana
 Jason Flemyng - Vlad

Awards
 Eddie - 2008, Best Edited Miniseries or Motion Picture for Non-Commercial Television
 Excellence in Production Design Award - 2008, Television Movie or Mini-Series

See also
 Radium Girls
 Walking ghost phase
 Half-life

External links
 
 Official HBO site
 
 
 The Half Life of Timofey Berezin at the TIFF 2006 archival site.

2006 films
2006 directorial debut films
2006 drama films
British drama films
Beacon Pictures films
Films about nuclear war and weapons
Films based on American novels
Films directed by Scott Z. Burns
Films set in 1995
Films set in Moscow
Films set in Russia
Films with screenplays by Scott Z. Burns
HBO Films films
Films about nuclear accidents and incidents
2000s English-language films
2000s British films